Vladimir L’vovich Arlazarov (Russian Арлазаров Владимир Львович) is a Russian computer scientist born in Moscow.

Research work 

In 1965 at Alexander Kronrod’s laboratory at the Moscow Institute for Theoretical and Experimental Physics (ITEP), Vladimir Arlazarov co-developed the ITEP Chess Program, together with Georgy Adelson-Velsky, Anatoly Uskov and Alexander Zhivotovsky, advised by Russian chess master Alexander Bitman and three-time world champion Mikhail Botvinnik.

At the end of 1966 a four game match began between the Kotok-McCarthy-Program, running on an IBM 7090 computer, and the ITEP Chess Program on a Soviet M-20 computer. The match played over nine months was won 3-1 by the ITEP program, despite playing on slower hardware.

By 1971, Mikhail Donskoy joined with Arlazarov and Uskov to program its successor on an ICL System 4/70 at the Institute of Control Sciences, called Kaissa, which became the first World Computer Chess Champion in 1974 in Stockholm.

Arlazarov is one of the inventors of the Method of Four Russians.

Selected publications

 Reprinted in Computer Chess Compendium

See also
David Levy

References

External links
Vladimir Arlazarov's ICGA Tournaments
Vladimir Arlazarov at Cognitive Technologies
The Fast Universal Digital Computer M-2 from the Russian Virtual Computer Museum
Early Reference on Bit-Boards by Tony Warnock, rec.games.chess archive, October 29, 1994

Russian computer scientists
Living people
Soviet computer scientists
Year of birth missing (living people)